DExH-box helicase 34 is a protein that in humans is encoded by the DHX34 gene.

Function

DEAD box proteins, characterized by the conserved motif Asp-Glu-Ala-Asp (DEAD), are putative RNA helicases. They are implicated in a number of cellular processes involving alteration of RNA secondary structure such as translation initiation, nuclear and mitochondrial splicing, and ribosome and spliceosome assembly. Based on their distribution patterns, some members of this DEAD box protein family are believed to be involved in embryogenesis, spermatogenesis, and cellular growth and division. This gene encodes a member of this family. It is mapped to the glioma 19q tumor suppressor region and is a tumor suppressor candidate gene. [provided by RefSeq, Jul 2008].

References

Further reading